Jack Wallace (21 May 1915 – 1 January 1991) was a British sailor. He competed in the Dragon event at the 1948 Summer Olympics.

References

External links
 

1915 births
1991 deaths
British male sailors (sport)
Olympic sailors of Great Britain
Sailors at the 1948 Summer Olympics – Dragon
Place of birth missing